Year's Best SF 13 is a science fiction anthology edited by David G. Hartwell and Kathryn Cramer that was published in 2008.  It is the thirteenth in the Year's Best SF series.

Contents

The book itself, as well as each of the stories, has a short
introduction by the editors.

Johanna Sinisalo: "Baby Doll" (Original English translation in The SFWA European Hall of Fame, 2007)
Tony Ballantyne: "Aristotle OS" (Originally in Fast Forward 1, 2007)
John Kessel: "The Last American" (Originally in Foundation 100, 2007)
Gene Wolfe: "Memorare" (Originally in F&SF, 2007)
Kage Baker: "Plotters and Shooters" (Originally in Fast Forward 1, 2007)
Peter Watts: "Repeating the Past" (Originally in Nature, 2007)
Stephen Baxter: "No More Stories" (Originally in Fast Forward 1, 2007)
Robyn Hitchcock: "They Came From the Future" (Originally in Fast Forward 1, 2007)
Gwyneth Jones: "The Tomb Wife" (Originally in F&SF, 2007)
Marc Laidlaw: "An Evening's Honest Peril" (Originally in  Flurb #3, 2007)
Nancy Kress: "End Game" (Originally in Asimov's, 2007)
Greg Egan: "Induction" (Originally in Foundation 100, 2007)
Bernhard Ribbeck: "A Blue and Cloudless Sky" (Original English translation in The SFWA European Hall of Fame, 2007)
Gregory Benford: "Reasons Not to Publish" (Originally in Nature, 2007)
William Shunn: "Objective Impermeability in a Closed System" (Originally in An Alternate History of the 21st Century, 2007)
Karen Joy Fowler: "Always" (Originally in Asimov's, 2007)
Ken MacLeod: "Who's Afraid of Wolf 359?" (Originally in The New Space Opera, 2007)
Tim Pratt: "Artifice and Intelligence" (Originally in Strange Horizons, 2007)
Terry Bisson: "Pirates of the Somali Coast" (Originally in Subterranean 7, 2007)
Ian McDonald: "Sanjeev and Robotwallah" (Originally in Fast Forward 1, 2007)
Tony Ballantyne: "Third Person" (Originally in The Solaris Book of New Science Fiction, 2007)
Kathleen Ann Goonan: "The Bridge" (Originally in Asimov's, 2007)
John G. Hemry: "As You Know, Bob" (Originally in Analog, 2007)
Bruce Sterling: "The Lustration" (Originally in Eclipse 1, 2007)
James Van Pelt: "How Music Begins" (Originally in Asimov's, 2007)

External links

2008 anthologies
Year's Best SF anthology series
Eos Books books
2000s science fiction works